The 2012 Tour of Oman was the third edition of the Tour of Oman cycling stage race. It was rated as a 2.1 event on the UCI Asia Tour, and was held from 14 to 19 February 2012, in Oman.

The race was won by Slovakia's Peter Velits, of the  team, taking the race lead on the penultimate day and holding it to the finish. Velits' winning margin over runner-up Vincenzo Nibali – winner of the race's queen stage to Jabal al Akhdar – was just one second, after Nibali tried to gain bonus seconds at one of the final day's intermediate sprints but could not gain time. The final place on the podium went to 's Tony Gallopin, sixteen seconds behind Nibali and 17 seconds down on Velits. In the race's other classifications, Peter Sagan of  won the points classification on the final stage, Gallopin won the white jersey for the youth classification with his third place overall in the general classification, 's Klaas Lodewyck won the combative classification for the race's intermediate sprints, and  finished at the head of the teams classification.

Teams
Sixteen teams competed in the 2012 Tour of Oman. These included eleven UCI ProTour teams, three UCI Professional Continental teams, and two Continental teams.
The teams participating in the race were:

RTS Racing Team

Stages

Stage 1
14 February 2012 – Al Alam Palace to Wadi Al Huwqayn,

Stage 2
15 February 2012 – Sur to Wadi Dhaiqah,

Stage 3
16 February 2012 – Al Awabi to BankMuscat,

Stage 4
17 February 2012 – Bidbid to Al Wadi al Kabir,

Stage 5
18 February 2012 – Royal Opera House Muscat to Jabal al Akhdar,

Stage 6
19 February 2012 – Al Khawd to Matrah Corniche,

Classification leadership

References

External links

2012
2012 in road cycling
2012 in Omani sport